Dana Jones may refer to:
 Dana Jones (basketball)
 Dana Jones (politician)